"Pepas" is a guaracha song by Puerto Rican singer-songwriter Farruko from his studio album La 167. It was released as single on June 24, 2021, via Sony Music Latin. It reached No. 25 on the US Billboard Hot 100 and number one on the US Hot Dance/Electronic Songs chart, becoming Farruko's highest-charting single to date. An official remix was released by David Guetta.

Background
Farruko called the song, a "total experiment". He gathered a few people in the studio and asking them to sing a stadium chant that sounded similar to a church choir.

Composition

"Pepas" starts off slow, then quickly picks up and morphs into something "reminiscent of pre-COVID-19 pandemic dance parties".

Music video
The music video was directed by Mike Ho and released on August 6, 2021. According to a description by Jessica Roiz of Billboard, it includes "an all-night-long rave with fireworks, dancers, men dressed in neon suits, and Farruko dancing on top of shipping containers".

Charts

Weekly charts

Year-end charts

In popular culture

The song was used by the 2021-22 Miami Heat as the team's anthem throughout the season. 

The Vancouver Whitecaps began using Pepas as their goal song during the 2022 season.

Real Madrid players celebrated their comeback victories (and eventual trophy win) on the dressing rooms by singing Pepas during the 2021–22 UEFA Champions League season.

Certifications

See also
List of Billboard Hot Latin Songs and Latin Airplay number ones of 2021
List of Billboard Hot Latin Songs and Latin Airplay number ones of 2022
List of Billboard Argentina Hot 100 top-ten singles in 2021

References

2021 singles
2021 songs
Farruko songs
Number-one singles in Portugal
Number-one singles in Romania
Number-one singles in Spain
Number-one singles in Switzerland
Sony Music Latin singles